The following notable composers have written a Symphony No. 7 in A Major:

 Ludwig van Beethoven's  Symphony No. 7, Op. 92 (1811-2)
 Max Trapp Symphony No. 7, Op. 55